Nuru International is a U.S.-based social venture that equips the poor living in remote, rural areas to end extreme poverty in their communities. Nuru is a Kiswahili word that means "light." Nuru International currently works in Kenya and Ethiopia. Nuru International received an overall rating of 84.09% from Charity Navigator for fiscal year 2019, 77.50% for its finances, 100% for accountability and transparency.

History
Nuru International was founded by CEO Jake Harriman, who attended the U.S. Naval Academy and served over 7 years in the U.S. Marine Corps as a Platoon Commander in both the Infantry and a Special Operations unit called Force Recon. Harriman led Marines in four operational deployments throughout Southwest Asia/the Middle East, Africa, and Southeast Asia, including two combat tours in Iraq during the Iraq War. He was awarded the Bronze Star for actions in combat during his second tour in Iraq.

Harriman's experiences in combat compelled him to believe that extreme poverty was a contributing factor to global terrorism. Harriman left his career in the Marine Corps and enrolled at Stanford University's Graduate School of Business to start an organization that would fight terrorism by ending extreme poverty. Nuru International began operations in 2008.

Development model
Nuru International trains and equips local leaders in effective poverty reduction methods gleaned from other humanitarian organizations around the world. Because of this approach, Nuru has been called a "general contractor of the NGO sector." Nuru is piloting an innovative community development model that is integrated, self-sustaining, and self-scaling and addresses four areas of need: 1) hunger, 2) inability to cope with economic shocks, 3) preventable disease and death, and 4) lack of access to quality education for children. By partnering with organizations such as One Acre Fund, Nuru seeks to create an efficient, scalable model

Servant Leadership
Nuru identifies and mentors local leaders in the principles of servant leadership, and mobilizes the community into groups led by these local leaders, supplying them with necessary expertise to lift their communities out of extreme poverty.

Sustainability and Scalability
Nuru integrates revenue generation models into all five of its program areas to achieve sustainability and eventually scale to achieving national impact.

Pilot project
Nuru International's first project is in Kuria, Kenya. Located in the southwest of the country, Kuria is one of the poorest districts in all of Kenya.

Since Nuru began partnering with the community in 2008, 5,525 farmers and their families have enrolled in Nuru's agriculture loan program. These farmers are experiencing a 123% increase of maize their yields on average. Nuru's other program areas (healthcare, education, community economic development) operate in concert with the agriculture program comprising a holistic approach to humanitarian development.

References

External links 

Nuru International's Statement on the Link Between Terrorism, Insurgency and Extreme Poverty

Charities based in California
Development charities based in the United States
Humanitarian aid organizations
Foreign charities operating in Kenya
Foreign charities operating in Ethiopia